Belorechensky is a rural locality (a settlement) Krasnoarmeyskoye Rural Settlement, Novonikolayevsky District, Volgograd Oblast, Russia. The population was 24 as of 2010. There are 4 streets.

Geography 
Belorechensky is located in steppe, on the Khopyorsko-Buzulukskaya Plain, 70 km east of Novonikolayevsky (the district's administrative centre) by road. Novoberezovsky is the nearest rural locality.

References 

Rural localities in Novonikolayevsky District